Rhyzodiastes gestroi is a species of ground beetle in the subfamily Rhysodinae. It was described by Antoine Henri Grouvelle in 1903. It is found on Sumatra (Indonesia).

References

Rhyzodiastes
Beetles of Indonesia
Fauna of Sumatra
Beetles described in 1903